Bruce Samuel Seldon (born January 30, 1967) is an American former professional boxer who competed from 1988 to 1996, and 2004 to 2009. He held the WBA heavyweight title from 1995 to 1996, most notably losing to Mike Tyson via knockout in his second defense.

Amateur career
Seldon compiled an amateur record of 20 wins and 4 losses, and won the New Jersey Golden Gloves in the super heavyweight division.

Professional career
Known as "The Atlantic City Express", Seldon began his career on October 4, 1988 with a first-round knockout of Joel McGraw and won his first 18 fights without a blemish. During his winning streak he defeated some notable boxers: Ezra Sellers (future world cruiserweight title challenger), Ossie Ocasio (former cruiserweight champion and heavyweight title challenger), David Bey (former world rated contender), and Jose Ribalta (former world title contender).

On April 18, 1991 future WBC heavyweight champion Oliver McCall handed Seldon his first defeat. Seldon was ahead on the scorecards but tired and was knocked down by McCall three times in the ninth. In his next fight Seldon was matched with future undisputed world heavyweight champion Riddick Bowe who defeated him.

Seldon returned in 1992 with a victory over Jesse Ferguson whom he stopped on an eye injury, but was knocked down and outpointed the same year by ex-champion Tony Tubbs. Seldon signed with promoter Don King in 1993 and boxed on a series of his undercards, most notably in August 1993 when he stopped ex-champion Greg Page in nine rounds.

WBA heavyweight champion
In 1995, world heavyweight champion George Foreman was stripped of the WBA title for declining to defend it against Tony Tucker. As Seldon was the second-ranked contender, a fight between him and Tucker was arranged for the vacant belt on April 8, 1995 in Las Vegas. Seldon, the underdog, used his jab to great effect and swelled Tucker's eye shut, to the point where the fight was stopped by the ringside doctor after seven rounds.

On August 18, 1995, Seldon fought on the undercard of the Mike Tyson-Peter McNeeley fight that marked Tyson's return to boxing. In the first defense of his title, Seldon again used his jab to control Joe Hipp and stop him in the tenth round.

Seldon vs Tyson

Seldon's next defense was scheduled against Tyson, who in early 1996 won the WBC title for a second time by knocking out Frank Bruno. The bout was originally to be a title unification fight, with both Seldon's WBA belt and Tyson's WBC belt at stake. However, the WBC mandated that Tyson defend his belt against former champion Lennox Lewis first. Since the fight with Seldon was already signed, Tyson vacated his belt and only Seldon's was on the line when the two fought on September 7, 1996.

The fight was marred by controversy as Seldon lost by knockout in the first round. His performance in the fight was vastly criticized, as he was knocked down twice on what appeared to be light or "phantom" punches from Tyson. Rumors started that Seldon had been paid to take a dive against Tyson, with the fans chanting "fix" following the decision. Although Seldon claimed in a post fight interview with Jim Gray that he did not take a dive, the criticism of his performance (including accusations that he took a dive) did not stop and Seldon elected to retire following the fight. Rapper Tupac Shakur attended the fight and was shot on the journey home, leading to his death six days later.

Comeback
Seldon attempted a comeback at age 37 in 2004. He defeated two journeymen before gaining a high-profile fight on HBO with Gerald Nobles. Abandoning his jab and boxing style for a punch out, Seldon decked Nobles in the second and was ahead on points but ended up throwing in the towel due to an eye injury in the ninth. In his next bout, an overweight Seldon was stopped in two rounds by Tye Fields. Seldon launched a second comeback in 2007, now into his 40s, and knocked out a series of journeymen before being knocked out himself by ranked contenders Kevin Johnson and Fres Oquendo. He was also KO'd in four during an exhibition with Alexander Povetkin.

Professional boxing record

References

External links
 

1967 births
Living people
African-American boxers
Boxers from New Jersey
Sportspeople from Atlantic City, New Jersey
Heavyweight boxers
World heavyweight boxing champions
World Boxing Association champions
American male boxers
21st-century African-American people
20th-century African-American sportspeople